The 2009 Liga Premier, also known as the TM Liga Premier for sponsorship reasons, is the sixth season of the Liga Premier, the second-tier professional football league in Malaysia.

The season was held from 9 January and concluded on 2 August 2009.

The Liga Premier champions for 2009 season was Harimau Muda. As a development team, Harimau Muda had to stay in Liga Premier while T-Team and Johor promoted to Liga Super as a second and third placed team in the league respectively. Kuala Lumpur was later promoted to Liga Super too to keep the team number balanced after Kuala Muda Naza and UPB-MyTeam withdrawal from Super League for 2010 season.

Teams

The following teams will participate in the competition:

  Sarawak¹
  Sabah
  Johor
  Felda United
  Proton
  Harimau Muda
  Malacca
  Shahzan Muda
  PKNS
  Kuala Lumpur
  ATM
  SDMS Kepala Batas²
  T–Team²
  MBJB²

¹ - Relegated from Liga Super² - Promoted from Liga FAM

League table

References

Malaysia Premier League seasons
2
Malaysia
Malaysia